Kevin Delmenico (born 18 May 1945) is a former Australian rules footballer who played for Footscray in the Victorian Football League (VFL).

Delmenico played his early football with Castlemaine before spending five seasons beside club great Ted Whitten at Footscray. A defender, he kicked the only goal of his career against Geelong in 1966, his debut season.

Demenico was captain-coach of Ganmain FC in the South West Football League (New South Wales) in 1971 and 1972.

He joined Canberra club Manuka in 1973 and played in three successive premierships, the last two as captain-coach. From 1976 to 1980, Delmenico coached Queanbeyan. During this time he coached the ACT at the 1979 Perth State of Origin Carnival. In 2011 he was inducted into the AFL Canberra Hall of Fame.

References

External links

1945 births
Living people
Western Bulldogs players
Castlemaine Football Club players
Manuka Football Club players
Queanbeyan Football Club players
Australian rules footballers from Victoria (Australia)
Australian rules football coaches